The V/Line RTL class is a road-rail locomotive, capable of operating on both road and rail. It was basically a truck with retractable rail wheels. Built by Western Star Trucks in the United States, the rail equipment was provided by Brandt Industries of Canada.

It was to be the first of three for V/Line Freight, but the other two were never completed. It was purchased for short-haul duties on grain lines, and began tests in January 1996 on the Dookie and Cobram lines. In 1999/2000 it was used to haul log trains between Bairnsdale and Sale on the Gippsland line. Numbered RTL1, its vehicle registration number was MVO782. It was included in the sale of V/Line Freight to Freight Australia, and was given the custom registration plate of MVORTL as M series plates are allocated to Victorian government vehicles and with it being placed into private ownership, was no longer eligible for such registration. It was included in the sale of Freight Australia to Pacific National.

After being stored at South Dynon Locomotive Depot for a number of years it was sold in 2011 to Just Track, and was used during the 2012 upgrade of the Gawler line in Adelaide. In 2015, it was used to haul wagon flats on the Southern Sydney Freight Line between Enfield and Leightonfield.

Locomotives

References

External links 
Peter J. Vincent: RTL class
Vicsig RTL class
Railpage Australia forum thread with sightings
Weston Langford gallery

Victorian Railways locomotives
Broad gauge locomotives in Australia
Standard gauge locomotives of Australia